Pošta Crne Gore is Montenegro's national postal service. It was created on 31 December 1998 following the division of PTT Montenegro into two separate organisations, one handling telecommunications (Crnogorski Telekom) and one handling postal service (Pošta Crne Gore).

History
Public postal traffic was introduced in Montenegro in 1841. The first stamp was printed in 1874. Montenegro was admitted into the Universal Postal Union on 26 July 2006, almost two months after re-gaining independence.

The first postal service followed in 1854 by the first post office built on the territory of Montenegro, on the initiative of the Austrians.

In 1903, the Montenegrin Post was the first in Europe to use motor vehicles to fulfill its mission of mail delivery.

On October 28, 1998, the division of PTT Saobraćaja Crne Gore, a Montenegrin postal, telegraph and telephone company, into two new companies was approved: a postal operator (Pošta Crne Gore) and a telecommunications operator (Telekom Crne Gore). It takes effect on December 31 of the same year.

See also
Postage stamps and postal history of Montenegro

References

External links
Official website (en)

Montenegro
Companies based in Podgorica
Logistics companies of Montenegro
Communications in Montenegro
Philately of Montenegro